Titt Run is a  long 1st order tributary to Buffalo Creek in Brooke County, West Virginia.  This is the only stream of this name in the United States.

Variant names
According to the Palmer's Farm Map of Brooke County, WV in 1914 this stream was also known by:.
Tiets Run

Course
Titt Run rises in Fowlerstown, West Virginia, and then flows southwest to join Buffalo Creek at McKinleyville.

Watershed
Titt Run drains  of area, receives about 40.1 in/year of precipitation, has a wetness index of 274.05, and is about 83% forested.

See also
List of rivers of West Virginia

References

Rivers of West Virginia
Rivers of Brooke County, West Virginia